Epermenia criticodes is a moth in the family Epermeniidae. It was described by Edward Meyrick in 1913. It is found in Kenya and the South African provinces of Western Cape and Mpumalanga.

References

Epermeniidae
Moths described in 1913
Lepidoptera of Kenya
Lepidoptera of South Africa
Moths of Africa